Luciano Guerzoni (28 July 1935 – 10 August 2017) was an Italian politician.

He was born in Modena, and spent all of his political career representing Emilia-Romagna. Guerzoni was president of the region from 1987 to 1990 and led its legislative assembly from 1990 to 1992. Guerzoni then represented Emilia-Romagna in the Senate for three terms, from 1992 to 1994 and again from 1996 to 2006.

References

1935 births
2017 deaths
Politicians from Modena
Italian Communist Party politicians
Democratic Party of the Left politicians
Democrats of the Left politicians
Democratic Party (Italy) politicians
Senators of Legislature XI of Italy
Senators of Legislature XII of Italy
Senators of Legislature XIII of Italy
Senators of Legislature XIV of Italy
Presidents of Emilia-Romagna